Canadian Psychology is a quarterly peer-reviewed academic journal published by the American Psychological Association on behalf of the Canadian Psychological Association. The journal was established in 1950 and publishes "articles in areas of theory, research, and practice that are potentially of interest to a broad cross-section of psychologists". The editor-in-chief is Vina Goghari (University of Toronto).

The journal is abstracted and indexed by the Social Sciences Citation Index. According to the Journal Citation Reports, the journal has a 2020 impact factor of 1.939.

References

External links

American Psychological Association academic journals
Quarterly journals
Psychology journals
Multilingual journals
Publications established in 1950
Canadian Psychological Association academic journals
English-language journals
French-language journals